Barkham Burroughs' Encyclopaedia of Astounding Facts and Useful Information is an encyclopedia and miscellany first published in 1889 by Barkham Burroughs.

Background 
Barkham Burroughs was reportedly a rear admiral in the United States Navy during the Benjamin Harrison administration. He was also reputed to have invented the return address in the United States. He died in 1952.

Contents 
The book has a particular focus on etiquette. It also contains home remedies and recipes.

Publication history 
The work was originally published in 1889. It was reprinted in 1983 by Miggs Burroughs, Barkham Burroughs's grandson.

References

Further reading 
 

1889 non-fiction books
English-language encyclopedias